Hampton Baptist Church is a church that meets at Bethany Chapel, Beards Hill, Hampton in the London Borough of Richmond upon Thames. It is a member of the London Baptist Association.

Hampton Baptist Church permanently closed in 2020, and is now part of Hampton Mission Partnership, Baptists and Methodists worshipping together at Hampton Methodist Church.

References

External links
 Official website
 London Baptist Association

Baptist churches in the London Borough of Richmond upon Thames